Salpichlaena volubilis is a species of fern belonging to the family Blechnaceae. It is native to the Magdalena River Basin of Colombia. It is most noteworthy for its fronds which can exceed forty feet (twelve meters) in length. and climb by twining.

References

Blechnaceae